Johanna Day (born 1964) is an American actress. She was nominated for two Tony Awards for her performances in the 2000 play Proof and the 2016 production of the play Sweat. Her other accolades include a Helen Hayes Award and an Obie Award, as well as nominations for a Drama Desk Award, a Drama League Award, an Outer Critics Circle Award and two Lucille Lortel Awards.

Early life
Johanna was born in Winchester, Virginia and grew up in Rappahannock County, Virginia.  She is the daughter and ninth child of Eileen Mitchell Day of Sperryville and Walter Day of Flint Hill.  She graduated from the American Academy of Dramatic Arts in 1984.

Career
In August 2013 Johanna Day costarred with Reg Rogers in the world premiere of Carly Mensch's play Oblivion at the Westport Country Playhouse.

She costarred with Amelia Campbell in Penn State Centre Stage 2013 production of  David Lindsay-Abaire's play Good People.

She appeared with Tracy Letts and Parker Posey in the world premiere of Will Eno's play The Realistic Joneses on April 20, 2012 at the Yale Repertory Theatre.

She appeared as Barbara Fordham in the 2007 performance of August: Osage County at the Imperial Theatre on Broadway and played Claire in the 2000 production of David Auburn's Proof at the Walter Kerr Theatre.

Off-Broadway
 1994 3 Postcards, by Craig Lucas & Craig Carnelia, Circle in the Square Theatre
 1996 Blue Window, by Craig Lucas, New York City Center Stage
 1997 How I Learned to Drive, by Paula Vogel, Century Center for the Performing Arts
 1998 Once in a Lifetime, by Moss Hart & George S. Kaufman, Linda Gross Theater
 2002 Helen, by Ellen McLaughlin, The Public Theater
 2002 Bliss, by Ben Bettenbender, Rattlestick Playwrights Theater
 2006 The Rainmaker, by N. Richard Nash, Arena Stage
 2006 Satellites, by Diana Son, Public Theater
 2007 Peter and Jerry, by Edward Albee, Second Stage Theatre
 2008 Almost an Evening, by Ethan Coen, Atlantic Theater Company
 2010 Oliver Parker!, by Elizabeth Meriwether, Cherry Lane Theater
 2010 Middletown, by Will Eno, Vineyard Theatre
 2012 Misery, by William Goldman, Bucks County Playhouse
 2022 Des Moines, by Denis Johnson, Theatre for a New Audience

Television
Joanna Day has frequently appeared in guest roles on television dramas including on Alpha House, Madam Secretary, Elementary, Masters of Sex, The Americans, Royal Pains, Fringe, Judging Amy, All My Children, Law & Order, Law & Order: Special Victims Unit, Law & Order: Trial by Jury, and Law & Order: Criminal Intent. She appeared in the 2011 television short Henry.

She is especially known for her role of Marilyn Stafford on the daytime TV drama All My Children.

Awards
Johanna Day won the Helen Hayes Award as Leading Actress in a Resident Play for her starring role in the 2006 Arena Stage production of The Rainmaker.

In 2000, she was nominated for a Tony Award for her performance in Proof.

In 2008, she was a nominee for the Drama Desk Award for Outstanding Featured Actress in a Play for her role of Ann in the Second Stage Theatre production of Edward Albee's Peter and Jerry.

In 2014, she won an Obie Award for her performance in Appropriate at the Alice Griffin Jewel Box Theatre. In 2017, she was nominated for a Tony Award for Best Featured Actress in a Play for her role in Sweat.

References

External links
 
 
 

Living people
American television actresses
American stage actresses
21st-century American actresses
1964 births
Actresses from Virginia
American film actresses
People from Winchester, Virginia
American Academy of Dramatic Arts alumni
People from Rappahannock County, Virginia
20th-century American actresses